Chun-Li is a videogame character from the Street Fighter 1v1 fighter videogame series with various surnames.

Chunli or Chun Li or Chun-Li or variant may also refer to:

People

Given name "Chunli"
 Bai Chunli (born 1953), Chinese chemist
 Chen Chun-li (1911–1969), Chinese actor and director
 Gu Chunli (born 1957), Chinese politician
 Kang Chun Li (847–894), general of Tang Dynasty China
 Jiang Chunli (born 1981), Chinese crosscountry skier
 Chunli Li (born 1962), Chinese-born New Zealand table tennis player
 Lu Chunli, Chinese Paralympian volleyballer
 Song Chunli (born 1951), Chinese actress
 Wang Chunli (born 1983), Chinese biathlete
 Wu Chun-li (born 1962), Taiwanese politician
 Zhao Chunli, a suspect in a January 2023 mass shooting in Half Moon Bay, California, USA

Given name "Chun" surname "Li"
Li Chun (warlord) (1867–1920), Chinese general
Li Chun (actress) (born 1988), Chinese actress
Li Zhun (1928–2000), Chinese writer, formerly romanized as Li Chun
Li Qinyao (born 1988), birth name Li Chun, Chinese actress
Mason Lee (born 1990; Chinese name 李淳, Li Chun), Taiwanese-American actor
Emperor Xianzong of Tang (778–820), personal name Li Chun, emperor of the Tang dynasty

Places
 Chunli, Iran; a village in Dowlatkhaneh Rural District, Bajgiran District, Razavi Khorasan Province

Other uses
 "Chun-Li" (song), a 2018 song by Nicki Minaj

See also

 
 
 , a cargo ship that started out as a U.S. WWII Victory Ship
 Li Chun (disambiguation)
 Chun (disambiguation)
 Li (disambiguation)

Human name disambiguation pages
Place name disambiguation pages